Daniel Bernard Bank (July 17, 1922 – June 5, 2010) was an American jazz saxophonist, clarinetist, and flautist. He is credited on some releases as Danny Banks.

He was born on July 17, 1922. Early in his career Bank played with Charlie Barnet (1942–1944), and would return to play with him repeatedly over the next few decades. He played with Benny Goodman, Tommy and Jimmy Dorsey, Artie Shaw and Paul Whiteman in the 1940s. Following this he recorded with Charlie Parker, Rex Stewart, the Sauter-Finegan Orchestra, Johnny Hodges, Urbie Green, Clifford Brown and Helen Merrill, Art Farmer, Wes Montgomery, Quincy Jones, Jimmy Smith, Chico O’Farrill, Betty Carter, Ray Charles, and Tony Fruscella.

Bank is best known for his association with Miles Davis in Gil Evans's orchestra; Bank played bass clarinet on the albums Miles Ahead, Sketches of Spain and Porgy and Bess. He played with Davis on his 1961 Carnegie Hall concert. Later in the 1960s he recorded with the big bands of Charles Mingus, Sonny Rollins, and Stanley Turrentine.

Bank died of natural causes on June 5, 2010.

Discography

As sideman
With Louis Armstrong
Louis Armstrong and His Friends (Flying Dutchman/Amsterdam, 1970)
With Bob Brookmeyer
Portrait of the Artist (Atlantic, 1960)
With Ralph Burns and Leonard Feather
Winter Sequence (MGM, 1954)
With Benny Carter
Central City Sketches (MusicMasters, 1987)
Harlem Renaissance (MusicMasters, 1992)
With Miles Davis
Miles Ahead (Columbia, 1957)
With Art Farmer
The Art Farmer Septet (Prestige, 1953–54)
Listen to Art Farmer and the Orchestra (Mercury, 1962)
With Maynard Ferguson
Ridin' High (Enterprise, 1967)
With Dizzy Gillespie
Afro (Norgran, 1954)
Dizzy and Strings (Norgran, 1954)
With Benny Golson
Pop + Jazz = Swing (Audio Fidelity, 1961)
With Urbie Green
All About Urbie Green and His Big Band (ABC-Paramount, 1956)
With Chico Hamilton
The Further Adventures of El Chico (Impulse!, 1966)
The Gamut (Solid State, 1968)
With Coleman Hawkins
The Hawk Talks (Decca, 1952-53 [1955])
With Jimmy Heath
Little Man Big Band (Verve, 1992)
With Johnny Hodges
Blue Notes (Verve, 1966)
 Don't Sleep in the Subway (Verve, 1967)
3 Shades of Blue (Flying Dutchman, 1970)
With Milt Jackson
Ray Brown / Milt Jackson with Ray Brown (Verve, 1965)
With J. J. Johnson
Goodies (RCA Victor, 1965)
Broadway Express (RCA Victor, 1965)
With Quincy Jones
The Birth of a Band! (Mercury, 1959)
With Eric Kloss
Grits & Gravy (Prestige, 1966)
With Irene Kral
SteveIreneo! (United Artists, 1959)
With Junior Mance
The Soul of Hollywood (Jazzland, 1962)
With Herbie Mann
Latin Mann (Columbia, 1965)
With Howard McGhee
Life Is Just a Bowl of Cherries (Bethlehem, 1956)
With Charles Mingus
The Complete Town Hall Concert (Blue Note, 1962 [1994])
With Milton Nascimento
Courage (A&M/CTI, 1969)
With Oliver Nelson
Oliver Nelson Plays Michelle (Impulse!, 1966)
Happenings with Hank Jones (Impulse!, 1966)
Encyclopedia of Jazz (Verve, 1966)
The Sound of Feeling (Verve, 1966)
The Spirit of '67 with Pee Wee Russell (Impulse!, 1967)
With Charlie Parker
Big Band (Clef, 1954)
With Oscar Pettiford
Basically Duke (Bethlehem, 1954)
The Oscar Pettiford Orchestra in Hi-Fi (ABC-Paramount, 1956)
With Lalo Schifrin and Bob Brookmeyer
Samba Para Dos (Verve, 1963)
With Shirley Scott
Roll 'Em: Shirley Scott Plays the Big Bands (Impulse!, 1966)
With Jimmy Smith
Monster (Verve, 1965)With Walter WanderleyMoondreams (A&M/CTI, 1969)With Ben WebsterMusic for Loving (Norgran, 1954)With Randy WestonTanjah (Polydor, 1973)With Kai Winding'Kai Olé (Verve, 1961)Penny Lane & Time'' (Verve, 1967)

References
[ Danny Bank] at Allmusic
 New York Times paid death notice for Daniel Bank

American jazz saxophonists
American male saxophonists
American jazz clarinetists
American jazz flautists
1922 births
2010 deaths
American male jazz musicians
American Jazz Orchestra members
20th-century American saxophonists
20th-century flautists